is a 2D scrolling shooter developed by Psikyo and published by Capcom as a sequel to the original Gunbird. It was originally released in Japanese arcades in 1998, and was later ported to the Dreamcast in 2000 and released worldwide. An Android version was released in Korea in 2014, before it came out worldwide on both Android and iOS in 2016. The arcade game was also included in Gunbird Special Edition for the PlayStation 2. A version was released on Nintendo Switch in June 2018.

Gameplay

There are seven stages in each game loop (two loops total). The first three stages are randomly chosen from possible four. At the second loop, enemies fire denser bullet patterns moving at faster speeds. Stage 2-1 takes place at the only stage not available in 1st loop, instead of the 1-1 counterpart. After completing the first loop with only one player, player can choose one of two choices for a wish with magic potion, with unique ending for each choice. If 1st loop is completed with two players, a combination-specific ending is played.

This was the first Psikyo shooter to feature medal-chaining: picking up 2,000 point medals (when they flash) repeatedly results in a slight point increase and a coin chain, recorded separately from the score. This was later featured in Strikers 1945 III/Strikers 1999.

The arcade game supports both English and Japanese languages, chosen via arcade board dip switch settings. The language setting is Japanese if dip switches are set to Japanese, English otherwise.

Two exclusive playable characters in the Sega Dreamcast port of Gunbird 2, released in 2000, includes Morrigan Aensland from the Darkstalkers series and Aine from the Samurai Aces series. Other new features include Internet ranking, gallery, and voices during intermission.

Plot
Seven warriors are challenged to head on a quest to find three powerful elements of Sun, Moon and Stars. Whoever brings the elements to God will be rewarded the legendary Almighty Potion and all its magical powers.

Reception

The Dreamcast and Nintendo Switch versions received "mixed or average reviews" according to the review aggregation website Metacritic. IGN's Anthony Chau said of the former console version: "I hope that most of you that decide to get Gunbird 2 are those that know the excitement of weaving between enemy fire, appreciate 2D artistry, and respect classic gameplay that never gets old. If that's you, you'll definitely be satisfied." GameSpot's Steven Garrett, however, was much more critical of the same console version, opining, "If a good 16-bit shooter is what you're looking for, you could do a lot better elsewhere." Electronic Gaming Monthly and Game Informer gave said console version mixed reviews, nearly two months before it was released Stateside. Jeff Lundrigan of NextGen said of the same console version, "If you want a ridiculously high level of pure twitch-response challenge, look no further. If you don't, well, move along." In Japan, Famitsu gave it a score of 29 out of 40.

Also in Japan, Game Machine listed the arcade version in their January 1, 1999 issue as the fourth most-successful arcade game of December 1998.

Legacy

Gunbird Special Edition

The PlayStation 2 version of the game was based on the arcade version.

Cancelled PlayStation Portable remake
An enhanced remake, titled Gunbird 2 Remix was announced by PM Studios for the PlayStation Portable in 2009. It was slated for an early 2010 release exclusively in digital format. No news has been heard since then, and it is considered vaporware.

Notes

References

External links
 X-nauts website
 Capcom website

Gunbird 2 at Sega Retro

Video games set in 1914
1998 video games
Arcade video games
Android (operating system) games
Cancelled PlayStation Portable games
Capcom games
Cooperative video games
Dreamcast games
IOS games
Kuusoukagaku games
Multiplayer and single-player video games
Nintendo Switch games
Psikyo games
Science fantasy video games
Steampunk video games
Vertically scrolling shooters
Video game sequels
Video games featuring female protagonists
Video games about witchcraft
Video games developed in Japan
Video games set in the Arctic
Video games set in the United States
Video games set in Italy
Video games set in Japan
Video games set in England
Virgin Interactive games